Gallaba ochropepla is a moth of the  family Notodontidae. It is known from Australia, including Tasmania, New South Wales and Victoria.

The wingspan is about 40 mm. Adults have fawn or grey forewings with a faint pattern of darker lines and speckles. The male also has a pale patch on each forewing costa. The hindwings are paler with no pattern and have recurved margins.

References

Notodontidae